The Coolidge Stores Building (also known as Landmark Tavern) is a historic commercial building located on US 20 in Bouckville, Madison County, New York.

Description and history 
It is a 2 1/2 story, Greek Revival style cobblestone building constructed in 1851. It is irregular in plan, featuring four, three-bay wide facades arranged in an arc of less than 90-degrees. Each of the four segments corresponds to an original store space with a wedge shaped floor plan. An unusual hexagonal cupola rises from the center of the roof.

It was listed on the National Register of Historic Places on January 26, 2001.

See also
James Coolidge Octagon Cobblestone House

References

Commercial buildings on the National Register of Historic Places in New York (state)
Commercial buildings completed in 1851
Cobblestone architecture
1851 establishments in New York (state)
National Register of Historic Places in Madison County, New York
Greek Revival architecture in New York (state)